China Legal Publishing House (中国法制出版社) is a publishing company in China.

History
The company is a state owned enterprise under the Legal Affairs Office of the State Council of China and was established on June 10, 1989. Its publications focus on official statutes and books related to the law.

External links
 Official Website of China Legal Publishing House

Book publishing companies of China
Mass media in Beijing
Publishing companies established in 1989